Pokémon: Battle Frontier is the ninth season of Pokémon and the fourth and final season of Pokémon the Series: Ruby and Sapphire, known in Japan as . It originally aired in Japan from October 6, 2005, to September 14, 2006, on TV Tokyo, and in the United States from September 9, 2006, to March 3, 2007, on Cartoon Network.

Set in the fictional Kanto region, the season follows the adventures of the ten-year-old Pokémon trainer Ash Ketchum and his electric mouse partner Pikachu as they collect Frontier Symbols from Frontier Brains in the Battle Frontier. Along the way, they are joined by Brock, the leader of the Pewter City Gym, as well as the Pokémon coordinator May and her brother Max, as May collects Ribbons from Pokémon Contests so she can compete in the Kanto Grand Festival.

The episodes were directed by Masamitsu Hidaka and Norihiko Sudo, and were produced by the animation studio OLM.

This is the first season of Pokémon to be localized into English by Pokémon USA after 4Kids Entertainment's contract was not renewed.



Episode list

Home media releases
Viz Media have released the series in the United States on two three-disc volume sets.

Volume One was released on June 24, 2008, and contained 24 episodes. Volume Two was released on September 16, 2008, and contained 23 episodes.

Viz Media and Warner Home Video later released the complete series on a 6-disc DVD boxset on January 8, 2019.

Notes

References

External links 
 
  at TV Tokyo 
  at TV Tokyo 
  at Pokémon JPN official website 

2005 Japanese television seasons
2006 Japanese television seasons
Season09